The GWR 3511 class were standard gauge  locomotives designed by William Dean for the Great Western Railway and built in 1885.

History
They comprised the last ten of the twenty locomotives of Lot 64.  The first ten locomotives of this Lot were built to the broad gauge as the 3501 class.

Use
Originally built with condensing apparatus they were used on work through the Severn Tunnel until the ventilation was improved.

Rebuilding
The condensing apparatus was soon removed and in 1894/5 they were all rebuilt as  tender locomotives of the 3201 class as were the 3501 class.

References

3511
Steam locomotives of Great Britain
2-4-0T locomotives
2-4-0 locomotives

Condensing steam locomotives